Rao Bahadur Arcot Sabhapathi Mudaliar was an Indian industrialist, businessman and Indian independence activist who was an early pioneer of the Indian National Congress and framed its constitution.

Personal life 
Sabhapathi Mudaliar was born in a Tamil-speaking Arcot Mudaliar family from Bellary in the then Madras Presidency. on completion of his studies, Mudaliar started a successful textile business.

Politics 
Mudaliar entered politics in 1982 when he volunteered to lead a campaign for the economic growth of Rayalaseema.Mudaliar represented Bellary at the first session of the Indian National Congress held in Bombay in December 1985. During the third session held in Madras in 1987, Mudaliar was appointed member of the 35-member committee which wrote the constitution of the congress.

Notes 

Businesspeople from Karnataka
Indian independence activists from Karnataka
Indian businesspeople in textiles
People from Bellary
Indian National Congress politicians from Karnataka
Karnataka politicians